Patricio Rojas (28 January 1933 – 27 May 2021) was a Chilean physician, surgeon and politician. As a politician he was minister of the interior (1969–1970) and national defence (1990–1994).

Rojas died on 27 May 2021, aged 88.

References

20th-century Chilean politicians
Chilean physicians
Chilean surgeons
1933 births
2021 deaths
People from Santiago
Place of death missing
Christian Democratic Party (Chile) politicians